Labor: Studies in Working-Class History is a peer reviewed quarterly journal which publishes articles regarding the history of the labor movement in the United States.  It is the official journal of the Labor and Working-Class History Association (LAWCHA) and is published by Duke University Press.  Labor is edited by Leon Fink (University of Illinois at Chicago), who previously edited Labor History.

Scope
The journal publishes articles which focus on workers and the economic and political regimes under which they perform work. Although much of the journal's focus is on labor unions in the United States, the journal has expanded its focus to examine non-union agricultural work, slavery, unpaid and domestic labor, informal employment, and other topics.  Articles focus primarily on the United States, but the journal has begun to focus on labor movements in North and South America as well as transnational comparisons that shed light on the American labor movement.

The target audience for the journal comprises academics, students, workers, and labor movement officials and activists.

Publication history
Labor: Studies in Working-Class History of the Americas was founded in February 2004 when Fink, along with the entire editorial board of Labor History and much of the staff, left that publication after a disagreement with publisher Taylor and Francis over the direction of the journal. According to Fink, the principal issue was maintaining the journal's editorial independence. Labor: Studies in Working-Class History of the Americas is endorsed by the Scholarly Publishing and Academic Resources Coalition (SPARC), as a SPARC Alternative. In 2016 the board voted to adjust the subtitle to Labor: Studies in Working-Class History to reflect a new translational scope that stretched beyond the Western hemisphere. As of  2017, the journal is housed in the Kalmanovitz Initiative for Labor and the Working Poor at Georgetown University.

Abstracting and indexing
The journal is abstracted and/or indexed in several selective, scholarly bibliographic databases, including: Alternative Press Index, America: History and Life, Historical Abstracts, MLA International Bibliography, SocINDEX, Sociological Abstracts, and SCOPUS.

Awards
Labor: Studies in Working-Class History of the Americas was chosen "Best New Journal" by the Council of Editors of Learned Journals in 2005.

External links

Labor and Working-Class History Association

References

Labour journals
History of the Americas journals
Works about the labor movement
History of labor relations in the United States
Duke University Press academic journals